The 2007 Melbourne Cup, the 147th running of Australia's most prestigious thoroughbred horse race, was run on Tuesday, 6 November 2007, going at 3:00 pm local time (0400 UTC).  The race was sponsored by Emirates Airline. The winner of the race was Efficient, by a half a length, followed by Purple Moon and Mahler in third.

Due to the 2007 Australian Equine influenza outbreak, believed to have been started by a horse brought into Australia from Japan, neither 2006 Melbourne Cup winner Delta Blues nor runner-up Pop Rock participated in the 2007 Melbourne Cup.

Field 

These were the confirmed starters, with barrier positions, jockeys, and trainers, for the 2007 Melbourne Cup:

The favourites for this year's Melbourne Cup were:

1. Master O'Reilly
2. Purple Moon
3. Zipping 
4. Sirmione
5. Princess Coup

Results

References

2007
Melbourne Cup
Melbourne Cup
2000s in Melbourne
November 2007 sports events in Australia